Goncharka is a rural locality (a settlement) in Giaginskoye Rural Settlement of Giaginsky District, Adygea, Russia. The population was 1,472 as of 2018. There are 21 streets.

Geography 
Goncharka is located 16 km southwest of Giaginskaya (the district's administrative centre) by road. Podgorny is the nearest rural locality.

References 

Rural localities in Giaginsky District